O. cornutus may refer to:
 Odontomachus cornutus, an ant species
 Oxyopes cornutus, a lynx spider species

See also
 Cornutus (disambiguation)